Final league standings for the 1914-15 St. Louis Soccer League.

History
The St. Louis Soccer League had split into two competing leagues, the Federal Park League and the Robison League, before the 1913-14 season.  This season, the Robison League played two halves with a mid-winter break.  At the end of the season, the champions from each league played against each other for the city championship.

Federal Park League

Robison League
Innisfails won the league title with 20 points over Columbus Club which had 18 points.

First half

Second half

City championship
Innisfails defeated St. Leo's.  The first game ended in a 2-2 tie with Innisfails taking the replay, 4-2.

References

External links
St. Louis Soccer Leagues (RSSSF)
The Year in American Soccer - 1915

1914-15
1914–15 domestic association football leagues
1914–15 in American soccer
St Louis Soccer
St Louis Soccer